= Tuberodiadelia =

Scientific classification
- Kingdom: Animalia
- Phylum: Arthropoda
- Class: Insecta
- Order: Coleoptera
- Suborder: Polyphaga
- Infraorder: Cucujiformia
- Family: Cerambycidae
- Genus: Tuberodiadelia
- Species: T. tubericollis

Binomial name
- Tuberodiadelia tubericollis Breuning, 1957

Genus of beetles

Tuberodiadelia tubericollis is a species of beetle in the family Cerambycidae, and the only species in the genus Tuberodiadelia. It was described by Stephan von Breuning in 1957.
